Tony Scheirlinck is a former football (soccer) player who represented New Zealand at international level.

Scheirlinck played three official full internationals for New Zealand, making his debut in a 0–0 draw with Indonesia on 9 September 1981. His other two matches were a 0–1 loss to United Arab Emirates on 9 September and a 1–0 win over Japan on 12 October 1981.

References 

Year of birth missing (living people)
Living people
New Zealand association footballers
New Zealand international footballers
Association footballers not categorized by position